Bartolomé Guillermo Blanche Espejo (June 6, 1879 – June 10, 1970) was a Chilean military officer and provisional president of Chile in 1932.

Life
He was born in La Serena, Coquimbo Region, where he completed his early studies. Later, he was accepted at the military academy. He had a very successful military career and was promoted to brigadier general in 1927.

Politics
In 1932, he became interior minister in the provisional government of Carlos Dávila. After the latter's resignation, he became provisional president on September 13, 1932. Nonetheless, the Antofagasta coup d'état of September 27, 1932, followed by the uprising of the army garrison of Concepción, forced him to resign less than a month later, on October 3.

He was replaced by Abraham Oyanedel, president of the Supreme Court of Justice.

External links
Official biography  

Bibliography:
Remembranzas del General Bartolome Blanche Espejo. . (2008)

1879 births
1970 deaths
People from La Serena
Heads of state of Chile
Chilean Ministers of the Interior
Chilean Ministers of Defense
Chilean Army generals
Chilean people of French descent
Liceo Gregorio Cordovez alumni